Juan Núñez García (born 4 June 2004) is a Spanish professional basketball player for ratiopharm Ulm of the German Basketball Bundesliga (BBL) and the EuroCup. He plays at the point guard position.

Club career
Born in Madrid, Núñez joined Real Madrid's youth ranks in 2015. In his junior years, he stood out with his passing ability. He was named MVP of the  2019–20 Euroleague Next Generation Tournament qualifying tournament in Munich, averaging 9.5 points and 5 assists in 4 games.

In 2021, Núñez won the Euroleague Next Generation Tournament with Real Madrid. Although he played in the group games, he did not feature in the final, as he was called up by Pablo Laso to the senior team amidst an injury crisis within the squad. 

On 6 June 2021, Núñez made his debut for Real Madrid's senior team in an ACB semi-final win against Valencia Basket, scoring 2 points from the free-throw line and adding 2 rebounds and 1 assist in 7 minutes of play. He was the 16th youth academy player to be introduced to the senior team by Pablo Laso.

On 15 August 2022, he signed with ratiopharm Ulm of the German Basketball Bundesliga.

References

External links
Núñez  Basketball  Real Madrid CF
Profile at FIBA
Profile at ACB
Profile at EuroLeague
Profile at RealGM
Profile at Eurobasket.com

2004 births
Liga ACB players
Living people
Point guards
Ratiopharm Ulm players
Real Madrid Baloncesto players
Spanish men's basketball players
Sportspeople from Madrid